Ophryosporus is a genus of South American flowering plants in the tribe Eupatorieae within the family Asteraceae.

 Species

 formerly included
Several once considered part of Ophryosporus now regarded as better suited to other genera: Decachaeta Koanophyllon Mikania Stomatanthes

References

External links

 
Asteraceae genera
Flora of South America
Taxonomy articles created by Polbot